"Aeon" is a single by American chamber pop band Antony and the Johnsons, originally released as part of their third studio album The Crying Light. It was released on August 3 (UK/Europe) and August 4 (US) on CD, digital and 7" vinyl as a double A-sided single.

The single features a cover of Beyoncé's 2003 chart topping hit "Crazy in Love", a song they had previously covered during their live shows. A video for the cover premiered on August 14, 2009 via Pitchfork.tv It was directed by Joie Iacono with footage of Pink Lady by James Elaine.

"Aeon" was performed on the Late Show with David Letterman on February 18, 2009. The song was covered by American indie rock band Cold War Kids for their eighth EP Tuxedos.

Track listings
"Aeon" - 4:35
"Crazy in Love" (Beyoncé cover) - 4:47

Personnel
 Mastered by Greg Calbi at Sterling Sound 
 Mixed by - Bryce Goggin at Trout Recordings

"Aeon"
 Bass - Jeff Langston 
 Composed and produced by - Antony Hegarty 
 Flute - Brian Miller and Keith Bonner 
 Guitar - Doug Wieselman 
 Harp - Bridget Kibbey 
 Piano, voice - Antony Hegarty
 Recorded by - Daniel Bora and Stewart Lerman 
 Strings - Julia Kent, Maxim Moston and Rob Moose

"Crazy In Love"
 Arranged by - Antony Hegarty, Nico Muhly 
 Cello - Julia Kent 
 Composed by - Beyoncé Knowles, Eugene Record, Richard Harrison and Shawn Carter 
 Contrabass - CJ Camerieri
 Harp - Jacqui Kerrod 
 Oboe - Alexandra Knoll 
 Piano - Nico Muhly 
 Recorded by - Bryce Goggin 
 Trumpet - CJ Camerieri
 Viola - Alissa Smith 
 Violin - Cenovia Cummins and Maxim Moston 
 Violin, mandolin and glockenspiel - Rob Moose
 Voice - Antony Hegarty''

References

2009 singles
Antony and the Johnsons songs
Cold War Kids songs
Rough Trade Records singles
2009 songs
Songs written by Anohni